CBC Radio 3 Sessions, Volume III is a compilation album released 9 October 2007 on MapleMusic. The album compiles tracks from various live sessions recorded between 2004 and 2006 for CBC Radio 3. Most of the sessions were recorded in Studio 2 of the CBC Regional Broadcast Centre Vancouver, though two were recorded at Studio 211 of the Canadian Broadcasting Centre in Toronto.

Track listing
 Joel Plaskett - "Nowhere With You" (3:02)
 Amy Millan - "Skinny Boy" (2:52)
 Bedouin Soundclash - "Stand Alone" (3:34)
 Destroyer - "The Crossover Song" (5:39)
 Chad VanGaalen - "Surrounded in Smoke" (3:31)
 Pink Mountaintops - "Erected" (3:20)
 You Say Party! We Say Die! - "What's the Hold-up? Where's the Fire?" (1:31)
 Shout Out Out Out Out - "Forever Indebted" (5:39)
 Tegan and Sara - "I Know, I Know, I Know" (3:38)
 Malajube - "La Valérie" (4:49)
 Tokyo Police Club - "A Lesson in Crime" (2:59)
 Cuff the Duke - "Blackheart" (5:16)

References 

03
2007 compilation albums